Phantom Lake is a natural lake in South Dakota, in the United States.

Phantom Lake was named for the phenomenon in which the lake vanishes from sight when seen from different angles.

See also
List of lakes in South Dakota

References

Lakes of South Dakota
Bodies of water of Bennett County, South Dakota